The Battles of Lexington and Concord were the first military engagements of the American Revolutionary War. The battles were fought on April 19, 1775, in Middlesex County, Province of Massachusetts Bay, within the towns of Lexington, Concord, Lincoln, Menotomy (present-day Arlington), and Cambridge. They marked the outbreak of armed conflict between the Kingdom of Great Britain and its thirteen colonies in America.

In late 1774, Colonial leaders adopted the Suffolk Resolves in resistance to the alterations made to the Massachusetts colonial government by the British parliament following the Boston Tea Party. The colonial assembly responded by forming a Patriot provisional government known as the Massachusetts Provincial Congress and calling for local militias to train for possible hostilities. The Colonial government effectively controlled the colony outside of British-controlled Boston. In response, the British government in February 1775 declared Massachusetts to be in a state of rebellion.

About 700 British Army regulars in Boston, under Lieutenant Colonel Francis Smith, were given secret orders to capture and destroy Colonial military supplies reportedly stored by the Massachusetts militia at Concord. Through effective intelligence gathering, Patriot leaders had received word weeks before the expedition that their supplies might be at risk and had moved most of them to other locations. On the night before the battle, warning of the British expedition had been rapidly sent from Boston to militias in the area by several riders, including Paul Revere and Samuel Prescott, with information about British plans. The initial mode of the Army's arrival by water was signaled from the Old North Church in Boston to Charlestown using lanterns to communicate "one if by land, two if by sea".

The first shots were fired just as the sun was rising at Lexington. Eight militiamen were killed, including Ensign Robert Munroe, their third in command. The British suffered only one casualty. The militia was outnumbered and fell back, and the regulars proceeded on to Concord, where they broke apart into companies to search for the supplies. At the North Bridge in Concord, approximately 400 militiamen engaged 100 regulars from three companies of the King's troops at about 11:00am, resulting in casualties on both sides. The outnumbered regulars fell back from the bridge and rejoined the main body of British forces in Concord.

The British forces began their return march to Boston after completing their search for military supplies, and more militiamen continued to arrive from the neighboring towns. Gunfire erupted again between the two sides and continued throughout the day as the regulars marched back towards Boston. Upon returning to Lexington, Lt. Col. Smith's expedition was rescued by reinforcements under Brigadier General Hugh Percy, a future Duke of Northumberland styled at this time by the courtesy title Earl Percy. The combined force of about 1,700 men marched back to Boston under heavy fire in a tactical withdrawal and eventually reached the safety of Charlestown. The accumulated militias then blockaded the narrow land accesses to Charlestown and Boston, starting the siege of Boston.

Ralph Waldo Emerson describes the first shot fired by the Patriots at the North Bridge in his "Concord Hymn" as the "shot heard round the world".

Background 

The British Army's infantry was nicknamed "redcoats" and sometimes "devils" by the colonists. They had occupied Boston since 1768 and had been augmented by naval forces and marines to enforce what the colonists called The Intolerable Acts of 1774, which had been passed by the British Parliament to punish the Province of Massachusetts Bay for the Boston Tea Party and other acts of protest.

General Thomas Gage was the military governor of Massachusetts and commander-in-chief of the roughly 3,000 British military forces garrisoned in Boston. He had no control over Massachusetts outside of Boston, however, where the implementation of the Acts had increased tensions between the Patriot Whig majority and the pro-British Tory minority. Gage's plan was to avoid conflict by removing military supplies from Whig militias using small, secret, and rapid strikes. This struggle for supplies led to one British success and several Patriot successes in a series of nearly bloodless conflicts known as the Powder Alarms. Gage considered himself to be a friend of liberty and attempted to separate his duties as governor of the colony and as general of an occupying force. Edmund Burke described Gage's conflicted relationship with Massachusetts by saying in Parliament, "An Englishman is the unfittest person on Earth to argue another Englishman into slavery."

The colonists had been forming militias since the very beginnings of Colonial settlement for the purpose of defense against Indian attacks. These forces also saw action in the French and Indian War between 1754 and 1763 when they fought alongside British regulars. Under the laws of each New England colony, all towns were obligated to form militia companies composed of all males 16 years of age and older (there were exemptions for some categories) and to ensure that the members were properly armed. The Massachusetts militias were formally under the jurisdiction of the provincial government, but militia companies throughout New England elected their own officers. Gage effectively dissolved the provincial government under the terms of the Massachusetts Government Act, and these existing connections were employed by the colonists under the Massachusetts Provincial Congress for the purpose of resistance to the military threat from Britain.

British government preparations 

A February 1775 address to King George III, by both houses of Parliament, declared that a state of rebellion existed:

On April 14, 1775, Gage received instructions from Secretary of State William Legge, Earl of Dartmouth, to disarm the rebels and to imprison the rebellion's leaders, but Dartmouth gave Gage considerable discretion in his commands. Gage's decision to act promptly may have been influenced by the information he received on April 15, from a spy within the Provincial Congress, telling him that although the Congress was still divided on the need for armed resistance, delegates were being sent to the other New England colonies to see if they would cooperate in raising a New England army of 18,000 colonial soldiers.

On the morning of April 18, Gage ordered a mounted patrol of about 20 men under the command of Major Mitchell of the 5th Regiment of Foot into the surrounding country to intercept messengers who might be out on horseback. This patrol behaved differently from patrols sent out from Boston in the past, staying out after dark and asking travelers about the location of Samuel Adams and John Hancock. This had the unintended effect of alarming many residents and increasing their preparedness. The Lexington militia, in particular, began to muster early that evening, hours before receiving any word from Boston. A well-known story alleges that after nightfall one farmer, Josiah Nelson, mistook the British patrol for the colonists and asked them, "Have you heard anything about when the regulars are coming out?" upon which he was slashed on his scalp with a sword. However, the story of this incident was not published until over a century later, which suggests that it may be a family myth.

Lieutenant Colonel Francis Smith received orders from Gage on the afternoon of April 18 with instructions that he was not to read them until his troops were underway. He was to proceed from Boston "with utmost expedition and secrecy to Concord, where you will seize and destroy ... all Military stores ... But you will take care that the soldiers do not plunder the inhabitants or hurt private property." Gage used his discretion and did not issue written orders for the arrest of rebel leaders, as he feared doing so might spark an uprising.

American preparations 

On March 30, 1775, the Massachusetts Provincial Congress issued the following resolution:

The rebellion's leaders—with the exception of Paul Revere and Joseph Warren—had all left Boston by April 8. They had received word of Dartmouth's secret instructions to General Gage from sources in London well before they reached Gage himself. Adams and Hancock had fled Boston to the home of one of Hancock's relatives, Jonas Clarke, where they thought they would be safe from the immediate threat of arrest.

The Massachusetts militias had indeed been gathering a stock of weapons, powder, and supplies at Concord and much further west in Worcester. An expedition from Boston to Concord was widely anticipated. After a large contingent of regulars alarmed the countryside by an expedition from Boston to Watertown on March 30, The Pennsylvania Journal, a newspaper in Philadelphia, reported, "It was supposed they were going to Concord, where the Provincial Congress is now sitting. A quantity of provisions and warlike stores are lodged there. ... It is ... said they are intending to go out again soon."

On April 18, Paul Revere began the "midnight ride" to Concord to warn the inhabitants that the British appeared to be planning an expedition. The ride was finished by Samuel Prescott. Upon hearing Prescott's news, the townspeople decided to remove the stores and distribute them among other towns nearby.

The colonists were also aware that April 19 would be the date of the expedition, despite Gage's efforts to keep the details hidden from all the British rank and file and even from the officers who would command the mission. There is reasonable speculation that the confidential source of this intelligence was Margaret Gage, General Gage's New Jersey-born wife, who had sympathies with the Colonial cause and a friendly relationship with Warren.

Between 9 and 10 pm on the night of April 18, 1775, Joseph Warren told Revere and William Dawes that the British troops were about to embark in boats from Boston bound for Cambridge and the road to Lexington and Concord. Warren's intelligence suggested that the most likely objectives of the regulars' movements later that night would be the capture of Adams and Hancock. They did not worry about the possibility of regulars marching to Concord, since the supplies at Concord were safe, but they did think their leaders in Lexington were unaware of the potential danger that night. Revere and Dawes were sent out to warn them and to alert colonial militias in nearby towns.

Militia forces assemble 

Dawes covered the southern land route by horseback across Boston Neck and over the Great Bridge to Lexington. Revere first gave instructions to send a signal to Charlestown using lanterns hung in the steeple of Boston's Old North Church. He then traveled the northern water route, crossing the mouth of the Charles River by rowboat, slipping past the British warship HMS Somerset at anchor. Crossings were banned at that hour, but Revere safely landed in Charlestown and rode west to Lexington, warning almost every house along the route. Additional riders were sent north from Charlestown.

After they arrived in Lexington, Revere, Dawes, Hancock, and Adams discussed the situation with the militia assembling there. They believed that the forces leaving the city were too large for the sole task of arresting two men and that Concord was the main target. The Lexington men dispatched riders to the surrounding towns, and Revere and Dawes continued along the road to Concord accompanied by Samuel Prescott. In Lincoln, they ran into the British patrol led by Major Mitchell. Revere was captured, Dawes was thrown from his horse, and only Prescott escaped to reach Concord. Additional riders were sent out from Concord.

The ride of Revere, Dawes, and Prescott triggered a flexible system of "alarm and muster" that had been carefully developed months before, in reaction to the colonists' impotent response to the Powder Alarm. This system was an improved version of an old notification network for use in times of emergency. The colonists had periodically used it during the early years of Indian wars in the colony before it fell into disuse in the French and Indian War. In addition to other express riders delivering messages, bells, drums, alarm guns, bonfires and a trumpet were used for rapid communication from town to town, notifying the rebels in dozens of eastern Massachusetts villages that they should muster their militias because over 500 regulars were leaving Boston. This system was so effective that people in towns  from Boston were aware of the army's movements while they were still unloading boats in Cambridge. These early warnings played a crucial role in assembling a sufficient number of colonial militia to inflict heavy damage on the British regulars later in the day. Adams and Hancock were eventually moved to safety, first to what is now Burlington and later to Billerica.

British forces advance 
Around dusk, General Gage called a meeting of his senior officers at the Province House. He informed them that instructions from Lord Dartmouth had arrived, ordering him to take action against the colonials. He also told them that the senior colonel of his regiments, Lieutenant Colonel Smith, would command, with Major John Pitcairn as his executive officer. The meeting adjourned around 8:30 pm, after which Earl Percy mingled with town folk on Boston Common. According to one account, the discussion among people there turned to the unusual movement of the British soldiers in the town. When Percy questioned one man further, the man replied, "Well, the regulars will miss their aim."

"What aim?" asked Percy. "Why, the cannon at Concord" was the reply. Upon hearing this, Percy quickly returned to Province House and relayed this information to General Gage. Stunned, Gage issued orders to prevent messengers from getting out of Boston, but these were too late to prevent Dawes and Revere from leaving.

The British regulars, around 700 infantry, were drawn from 11 of Gage's 13 occupying infantry regiments. Major Pitcairn commanded ten elite light infantry companies, and Lieutenant Colonel Benjamin Bernard commanded 11 grenadier companies, under the overall command of Lieutenant Colonel Smith.

Of the troops assigned to the expedition, 350 were from grenadier companies drawn from the 4th (King's Own), 5th, 10th, 18th (Royal Irish), 23rd, 38th, 43rd, 47th, 52nd and 59th Regiments of Foot, and the 1st Battalion of His Majesty's Marine Forces. Protecting the grenadier companies were about 320 light infantry from the 4th, 5th, 10th, 23rd, 38th, 43rd, 47th, 52nd, and 59th Regiments, and the 1st Battalion of the Marines. Each company had its own lieutenant, but the majority of the captains commanding them were volunteers attached to them at the last minute, drawn from all the regiments stationed in Boston. This lack of familiarity between commander and company would cause problems during the battle.

The British began to awaken their troops at 9 pm on the night of April 18 and assembled them on the water's edge on the western end of Boston Common by 10 pm. Colonel Smith was late in arriving, and there was no organized boat-loading operation, resulting in confusion at the staging area. The boats used were naval barges that were packed so tightly that there was no room to sit down. When they disembarked near Phipps Farm in Cambridge, it was into waist-deep water at midnight. After a lengthy halt to unload their gear, the regulars began their  march to Concord at about 2 am. During the wait they were provided with extra ammunition, cold salt pork, and hard sea biscuits. They did not carry knapsacks, since they would not be encamped. They carried their haversacks (food bags), canteens, muskets, and accoutrements, and marched off in wet, muddy shoes and soggy uniforms. As they marched through Menotomy, sounds of the colonial alarms throughout the countryside caused the few officers who were aware of their mission to realize they had lost the element of surprise.

At about 3 am, Colonel Smith sent Major Pitcairn ahead with six companies of light infantry under orders to quick march to Concord. At about 4 am Smith made the wise but belated decision to send a messenger back to Boston asking for reinforcements.

Order of Battle

Continentals 
The continental force included some 4,000 militia and local minuteman companies. Although the Provincial Congress had organized local companies into regiments and brigades with designated commanders, units turned out piecemeal over the course of the day. Thirty towns from the surrounding area sent men into combat with many more on the way. By afternoon, many regimental commands were fundamentally present and acting in a coordinated manner. Several provincial generals were en route to the fighting during the day but not in a position to assert overall command. General William Heath of Roxbury, Massachusetts exerted command of a phase of the fighting toward the day's end.

British Forces 
The British force was organized into:
 Column
 Commander, Lieutenant Colonel Francis Smith
 Supernumeraries (6 Officers)
 Mitchell's Party (8+ Officers)
 Flank Companies (Grenadiers and Light Infantry) from:
 4th (The King's Own) Regiment of Foot
 5th Regiment of Foot
 10th Regiment of Foot
 18th (The Royal Irish) Regiment of Foot (Grenadiers only)
 23rd Regiment of Foot (Royal Welch Fusiliers)
 38th Regiment of Foot
 43rd Regiment of Foot
 47th Regiment of Foot
 52nd Regiment of Foot
 59th Regiment of Foot
 1st Battalion, Royal Marines
 Relief Force
 Commander, Brigadier General His Grace Hugh Percy, 2nd Duke of Northumberland
 2 6-pounder guns from 4th Battalion, Royal Artillery
 Battalion Companies from (7 regular companies, these didn't include the flank companies):
 4th (The King's Own) Regiment of Foot
 23rd Regiment of Foot (Royal Welch Fusiliers)
 47th Regiment of Foot
 1st Battalion, Royal Marines

Battles

Lexington 

Although often styled a battle, in reality, the engagement at Lexington was a minor brush or skirmish. As the regulars' advance guard under Pitcairn entered Lexington at sunrise on April 19, 1775, about 80 Lexington militiamen emerged from Buckman Tavern and stood in ranks on the village common watching them, and between 40 and 100 spectators watched from along the side of the road. Their leader was Captain John Parker, a veteran of the French and Indian War, who had developed tuberculosis and was at times difficult to hear. Of the militiamen who lined up, nine had the surname Harrington, seven Munroe (including the company's orderly sergeant, William Munroe), four Parker, three Tidd, three Locke, and three Reed; fully one-quarter of them were related to Captain Parker in some way. This group of militiamen was part of Lexington's "training band", a way of organizing local militias dating back to the Puritans, and not what was styled a minuteman company.

After having waited most of the night with no sign of any British troops (and wondering if Paul Revere's warning was true), at about 4:15 a.m., Parker got his confirmation. Thaddeus Bowman, the last scout that Parker had sent out, rode up at a gallop and told him that they were not only coming but coming in force and they were close. Captain Parker was clearly aware that he was outmatched in the confrontation and was not prepared to sacrifice his men for no purpose. He knew that most of the colonists' powder and military supplies at Concord had already been hidden. No war had been declared. (The Declaration of Independence was more than fourteen months in the future.) He also knew the British had gone on such expeditions before in Massachusetts, found nothing, and marched back to Boston.

Parker had every reason to expect that to occur again. The Regulars would march to Concord, find nothing, and return to Boston, tired but empty-handed. He positioned his company carefully. He placed them in parade-ground formation, on Lexington Common. They were in plain sight (not hiding behind walls), but not blocking the road to Concord. They made a show of political and military determination, but no effort to prevent the march of the Regulars. Many years later, one of the participants recalled Parker's words as being what is now engraved in stone at the site of the battle: "Stand your ground; don't fire unless fired upon, but if they mean to have a war, let it begin here." According to Parker's sworn deposition taken after the battle:

Rather than turn left towards Concord, Marine Lieutenant Jesse Adair, at the head of the advance guard, decided on his own to protect the flank of the British column by first turning right and then leading the companies onto the Common itself, in a confused effort to surround and disarm the militia. Major Pitcairn arrived from the rear of the advance force and led his three companies to the left and halted them. The remaining companies under Colonel Smith lay further down the road toward Boston.

First shot 
A British officer (probably Pitcairn, but accounts are uncertain, as it may also have been Lieutenant William Sutherland) then rode forward, waving his sword, and called out for the assembled militia to disperse, and may also have ordered them to "lay down your arms, you damned rebels!" Captain Parker told his men instead to disperse and go home, but, because of the confusion, the yelling all around, and due to the raspiness of Parker's tubercular voice, some did not hear him, some left very slowly, and none laid down their arms. Both Parker and Pitcairn ordered their men to hold fire, but a shot was fired from an unknown source.

According to one member of Parker's militia, none of the Americans had discharged their muskets as they faced the oncoming British troops. The British did suffer one casualty, a slight wound, the particulars of which were corroborated by a deposition made by Corporal John Munroe. Munroe stated that:

Some witnesses among the regulars reported the first shot was fired by a colonial onlooker from behind a hedge or around the corner of a tavern. Some observers reported a mounted British officer firing first. Both sides generally agreed that the initial shot did not come from the men on the ground immediately facing each other. Speculation arose later in Lexington that a man named Solomon Brown fired the first shot from inside the tavern or from behind a wall, but this has been discredited. Some witnesses (on each side) claimed that someone on the other side fired first; however, many more witnesses claimed to not know. Yet another theory is that the first shot was one fired by the British, that killed Asahel Porter, their prisoner who was running away (he had been told to walk away and he would be let go, though he panicked and began to run). Historian David Hackett Fischer has proposed that there may actually have been multiple near-simultaneous shots.

Historian Mark Urban said that after telling them to disperse, 

Witnesses at the scene described several intermittent shots fired from both sides before the lines of regulars began to fire volleys without receiving orders to do so. A few of the militiamen believed at first that the regulars were only firing powder with no ball, but when they realized the truth, few if any of the militia managed to load and return fire. The rest ran for their lives.

The regulars then charged forward with bayonets. Captain Parker's cousin Jonas was run through. Eight Lexington men were killed, and ten were wounded. The only British casualty was a soldier who was wounded in the thigh. The eight colonists killed were John Brown, Samuel Hadley, Caleb Harrington, Jonathon Harrington, Robert Munroe, Isaac Muzzey, Asahel Porter, and Jonas Parker. Jonathon Harrington, fatally wounded by a British musket ball, managed to crawl back to his home, and died on his own doorstep. One wounded man, Prince Estabrook, was a black slave who was serving in the militia.

The companies under Pitcairn's command got beyond their officers' control in part because they were unaware of the actual purpose of the day's mission. They fired in different directions and prepared to enter private homes. Colonel Smith, who was just arriving with the remainder of the regulars, heard the musket fire and rode forward from the grenadier column to see the action. He quickly found a drummer and ordered him to beat assembly. The grenadiers arrived shortly thereafter, and once order was restored among the soldiers, the light infantry was permitted to fire a victory volley, after which the column was reformed and marched on toward Concord.

Concord 

In response to the raised alarm, the militiamen of Concord and Lincoln had mustered in Concord. They received reports of firing at Lexington and were not sure whether to wait until they could be reinforced by troops from towns nearby, or to stay and defend the town, or to move east and greet the British Army from superior terrain. A column of militia marched down the road toward Lexington to meet the British, traveling about  until they met the approaching column of regulars. The militia retreated to a ridge overlooking the town, and their officers discussed what to do next. Caution prevailed, and Colonel James Barrett withdrew from the center of town and led the men across the North Bridge to a hill about a mile north, where they could continue to watch the troop movements of the British and the activities in the town center. This step proved fortuitous, as the ranks of the militia continued to grow as minuteman companies arriving from the western towns joined them there.

Search for militia supplies 
When the British troops arrived in the village of Concord, Lt. Col. Smith divided them to carry out Gage's orders. The 10th Regiment's company of grenadiers secured South Bridge under Captain Mundy Pole, while seven companies of light infantry under Captain Parsons, numbering about 100, secured the North Bridge, where they were visible across the cleared fields to the assembling militia companies. Captain Parsons took four companies from the 5th, 23rd, 38th, and 52nd Regiments up the road  beyond the North Bridge to search Barrett's Farm, where intelligence indicated supplies would be found. Two companies from the 4th and 10th Regiments were stationed to guard their return route, and one company from the 43rd remained to guard the bridge itself. These companies, which were under the relatively inexperienced command of Captain Walter Laurie, were aware that they were significantly outnumbered by the 400-plus militiamen. The concerned Captain Laurie sent a messenger to Lt. Col. Smith requesting reinforcements.

Using detailed information provided by Loyalist spies, the grenadier companies searched the small town for military supplies. When they arrived at Ephraim Jones's tavern, by the jail on the South Bridge road, they found the door barred shut, and Jones refused them entry. According to reports provided by local Loyalists, Pitcairn knew cannon had been buried on the property. Jones was ordered at gunpoint to show where the guns were buried. These turned out to be three massive pieces, firing 24-pound shot, that were much too heavy to use defensively, but very effective against fortifications, with sufficient range to bombard the city of Boston from other parts of nearby mainland. The grenadiers smashed the trunnions of these three guns so they could not be mounted. They also burned some gun carriages found in the village meetinghouse, and when the fire spread to the meetinghouse itself, local resident Martha Moulton persuaded the soldiers to help in a bucket brigade to save the building. Nearly a hundred barrels of flour and salted food were thrown into the millpond, as were 550 pounds of musket balls. Of the damage done, only that done to the cannon was significant. All of the shot and much of the food was recovered after the British left. During the search, the regulars were generally scrupulous in their treatment of the locals, including paying for food and drink consumed. This excessive politeness was used to advantage by the locals, who were able to misdirect searches from several smaller caches of militia supplies.

Barrett's Farm had been an arsenal weeks before, but few weapons remained now, and according to family legend, these were quickly buried in furrows to look like a crop had been planted. The troops sent there did not find any supplies of consequence.

North Bridge 

As the militia advanced, the two British companies from the 4th and 10th Regiments that held the position near the road retreated to the bridge and yielded the hill to Barrett's men.

Five full companies of Minutemen and five more of militia from Acton, Concord, Bedford and Lincoln occupied this hill as more groups of men streamed in, totaling at least 400 against Captain Laurie's light infantry companies, a force totaling 90–95 men. Barrett ordered the Massachusetts men to form one long line two abreast on the highway leading down to the bridge, and then he called for another consultation. While overlooking North Bridge from the top of the hill, Barrett, Lt. Col. John Robinson of Westford and the other captains discussed a possible advance on the bridge. Barrett asked Captain Isaac Davis, who commanded a company of Minutemen from Acton, if his company would be willing to lead the advance. Davis responded, "I'm not afraid to go, and I haven't a man that's afraid to go."

Barrett told the men to load their weapons but not to fire unless fired upon, and then ordered them to advance. Laurie ordered the British companies guarding the bridge to retreat across it. One officer then tried to pull up the loose planks of the bridge to impede the colonial advance, but Major Buttrick began to yell at the regulars to stop harming the bridge. The Minutemen and militia from Concord, Acton, Lincoln and a handful of Westford Minutemen, advanced in column formation, two by two, led by Major Buttrick, Lt. Col. Robinson, then Capt. Davis, on the light infantry, keeping to the road, since it was surrounded by the spring floodwaters of the Concord River.

Captain Laurie then made a poor tactical decision. Since his summons for help had not produced any results, he ordered his men to form positions for "street firing" behind the bridge in a column running perpendicular to the river. This formation was appropriate for sending a large volume of fire into a narrow alley between the buildings of a city, but not for an open path behind a bridge. Confusion reigned as regulars retreating over the bridge tried to form up in the street-firing position of the other troops. Lieutenant Sutherland, who was in the rear of the formation, saw Laurie's mistake and ordered flankers to be sent out. But as he was from a company different from the men under his command, only three soldiers obeyed him. The remainder tried as best they could in the confusion to follow the orders of the superior officer.

A shot rang out. It was likely a warning shot fired by a panicked, exhausted British soldier from the 43rd, according to Captain Laurie's report to his commander after the fight. Two other regulars then fired immediately after that, shots splashing in the river, and then the narrow group up front, possibly thinking the order to fire had been given, fired a ragged volley before Laurie could stop them.

Two of the Acton Minutemen, Private Abner Hosmer and Captain Isaac Davis, who were at the head of the line marching to the bridge, were hit and killed instantly. Rev. Dr. Ripley recalled:

Four more men were wounded. Major Buttrick then yelled to the militia, "Fire, for God's sake, fellow soldiers, fire!" The few front rows of colonists, bound by the road and blocked from forming a line of fire, managed to fire over each other's heads and shoulders at the regulars massed across the bridge. Four of the eight British officers and sergeants, who were leading from the front of their troops, were wounded by the volley of musket fire. At least three privates (Thomas Smith, Patrick Gray, and James Hall, all from the 4th) were killed or mortally wounded, and nine were wounded. In 1824, Reverend and Minuteman Joseph Thaxter wrote:

The regulars found themselves trapped in a situation where they were both outnumbered and outmaneuvered. Lacking effective leadership and terrified at the superior numbers of the enemy, with their spirit broken, and likely not having experienced combat before, they abandoned their wounded, and fled to the safety of the approaching grenadier companies coming from the town center, isolating Captain Parsons and the companies searching for arms at Barrett's Farm.

After the fight 

The colonists were stunned by their success. No one had actually believed either side would shoot to kill the other. Some advanced; many more retreated; and some went home to see to the safety of their homes and families. Colonel Barrett eventually began to recover control.

Lieutenant Colonel Smith heard the exchange of fire from his position in the town moments after he received the request for reinforcements from Laurie. He quickly assembled two companies of grenadiers to lead toward the North Bridge himself. As these troops marched, they met the shattered remnants of the three light infantry companies running towards them. Smith was concerned about the four companies that had been at Barrett's since their route to town was now unprotected. When he saw the Minutemen in the distance behind their wall, he halted his two companies and moved forward with only his officers to take a closer look. One of the Minutemen behind that wall observed, "If we had fired, I believe we could have killed almost every officer there was in the front, but we had no orders to fire and there wasn't a gun fired." During a tense standoff lasting about 10 minutes, a mentally ill local man named Elias Brown wandered through both sides selling hard cider.

At this point, the detachment of regulars sent to Barrett's farm marched back from their fruitless search of that area. They passed through the now mostly-deserted battlefield and saw dead and wounded comrades lying on the bridge. There was one who looked to them as if he had been scalped, which angered and shocked the British soldiers. They crossed the bridge and returned to the town by 11:30 a.m., under the watchful eyes of the colonists, who continued to maintain defensive positions. The regulars continued to search for and destroy colonial military supplies in the town, ate lunch, reassembled for marching, and left Concord after noon. This delay in departure gave colonial militiamen from outlying towns additional time to reach the road back to Boston.

Return march

Concord to Lexington 

Lieutenant Colonel Smith, concerned about the safety of his men, sent flankers to follow a ridge and protect his forces from the roughly 1,000 colonials now in the field as the British marched east out of Concord. This ridge ended near Meriam's Corner, a crossroads about a mile (2 km) outside the village of Concord, where the main road came to a bridge across a small stream. To cross the narrow bridge, the British had to pull the flankers back into the main column and close ranks to a mere three soldiers abreast. Colonial militia companies arriving from the north and east had converged at this point and held a clear numerical advantage over the regulars. The British were now witnessing once again what General Gage had hoped to avoid by dispatching the expedition in secrecy and in the dark of night: the ability of the colonial militiamen to rise and converge by the thousands when British forces ventured out of Boston. As the last of the British column marched over the narrow bridge, the British rear guard wheeled and fired a volley at the colonial militiamen, who had been firing irregularly and ineffectively from a distance but now had closed to within musket range. The colonists returned fire, this time with deadly effect. Two regulars were killed and perhaps six wounded, with no colonial casualties. Smith sent out his flanking troops again after crossing the small bridge.

On Brooks Hill (also known as Hardy's Hill) about  past Meriam's Corner, nearly 500 militiamen had assembled to the south of the road, awaiting an opportunity to fire down upon the British column on the road below. Smith's leading forces charged up the hill to drive them off, but the colonists did not withdraw, inflicting significant casualties on the attackers. Smith withdrew his men from Brooks Hill, and the column continued on to another small bridge into Lincoln, at Brooks Tavern, where more militia companies intensified the attack from the north side of the road.

The regulars soon reached a point in the road, now referred to as the "Bloody Angle", where the road rises and curves sharply to the left through a lightly wooded area. At this place, the militia company from Woburn had positioned themselves on the southeast side of the bend in the road in a rocky, lightly wooded field. Additional militia flowing parallel to the road from the engagement at Meriam's Corner positioned themselves on the northwest side of the road, catching the British in a crossfire, while other militia companies on the road closed from behind to attack. Some  further along, the road took another sharp curve, this time to the right, and again the British column was caught by another large force of militiamen firing from both sides. In passing through these two sharp curves, the British force lost thirty soldiers killed or wounded, and four colonial militia were also killed, including Captain Jonathan Wilson of Bedford, Captain Nathan Wyman of Billerica, Lt. John Bacon of Natick, and Daniel Thompson of Woburn. The British soldiers escaped by breaking into a trot, a pace that the colonials could not maintain through the woods and swampy terrain. Colonial forces on the road itself behind the British were too densely packed and disorganized to mount more than a harassing attack from the rear.

As militia forces from other towns continued to arrive, the colonial forces had risen to about 2,000 men. The road now straightened to the east, with cleared fields and orchards along the sides. Lt. Col. Smith sent out flankers again, who succeeded in trapping some militia from behind and inflicting casualties. British casualties were also mounting from these engagements and from persistent long-range fire from the militiamen, and the exhausted British were running out of ammunition.

When the British column neared the boundary between Lincoln and Lexington, it encountered another ambush from a hill overlooking the road, set by Captain John Parker's Lexington militiamen, including some of them bandaged up from the encounter in Lexington earlier in the day. At this point, Lt. Col. Smith was wounded in the thigh and knocked from his horse. Major John Pitcairn assumed effective command of the column and sent light infantry companies up the hill to clear the militia forces.

The light infantry cleared two additional hills as the column continued east—"The Bluff" and "Fiske Hill"— and took still more casualties from ambushes set by fresh militia companies joining the battle. In one of the musket volleys from the colonial soldiers, Major Pitcairn's horse bolted in fright, throwing Pitcairn to the ground and injuring his arm. Now both principal leaders of the expedition were injured or unhorsed, and their men were tired, thirsty, and exhausting their ammunition. A few surrendered or were captured; some now broke formation and ran forward toward Lexington. In the words of one British officer, "we began to run rather than retreat in order. ... We attempted to stop the men and form them two deep, but to no purpose, the confusion increased rather than lessened. ... the officers got to the front and presented their bayonets, and told the men if they advanced they should die. Upon this, they began to form up under heavy fire."

Only one British officer remained uninjured among the three companies at the head of the British column as it approached Lexington Center. He understood the column's perilous situation: "There were very few men had any ammunition left, and so fatigued that we could not keep flanking parties out, so that we must soon have laid down our arms, or been picked off by the Rebels at their pleasure—nearer to—and we were not able to keep them off." He then heard cheering further ahead. A full brigade, about 1,000 men with artillery under the command of Earl Percy, had arrived to rescue them. It was about 2:30 p.m., and the British column had now been on the march since 2 o'clock in the morning. Westford Minuteman, Rev. Joseph Thaxter, wrote of his account:

In their accounts afterward, British officers and soldiers alike noted their frustration that the colonial militiamen fired at them from behind trees and stone walls, rather than confronting them in large, linear formations in the style of European warfare. This image of the individual colonial farmer, musket in hand and fighting under his own command, has also been fostered in American myth: "Chasing the red-coats down the lane / Then crossing the fields to emerge again / Under the trees at the turn of the road, / And only pausing to fire and load." To the contrary, beginning at the North Bridge and throughout the British retreat, the colonial militias repeatedly operated as coordinated companies, even when dispersed to take advantage of cover. Reflecting on the British experience that day, Earl Percy understood the significance of the American tactics:

Percy's rescue 

General Gage had anticipated that Lt. Col. Smith's expedition might require reinforcement, so Gage drafted orders for reinforcing units to assemble in Boston at 4 a.m. But in his obsession for secrecy, Gage had sent only one copy of the orders to the adjutant of the 1st Brigade, whose servant then left the envelope on a table. Also at about 4 a.m., the British column was within three miles of Lexington, and Lt. Col. Smith now had a clear indication that all element of surprise had been lost and that alarm was spreading throughout the countryside. So he sent a rider back to Boston with a request for reinforcements. At about 5 a.m., the rider reached Boston, and the 1st Brigade was ordered to assemble: the line infantry companies of the 4th, 23rd, and 47th Regiments, and a battalion of Royal Marines, under the command of Earl Percy. Unfortunately for the British, once again only one copy of the orders was sent to each commander, and the order for the Royal Marines was delivered to the desk of Major John Pitcairn, who was already on the Lexington Common with Smith's column at that hour. After these delays, Percy's brigade, about 1,000 strong, left Boston at about 8:45 a.m., headed toward Lexington. Along the way, the story is told, they marched to the tune of "Yankee Doodle" to taunt the inhabitants of the area. By the Battle of Bunker Hill less than two months later, the song would become a popular anthem for the colonial forces.

Percy took the land route across Boston Neck and over the Great Bridge, which some quick-thinking colonists had stripped of its planking to delay the British. His men then came upon an absent-minded tutor at Harvard College and asked him which road would take them to Lexington. The Harvard man, apparently oblivious to the reality of what was happening around him, showed him the proper road without thinking. (He was later compelled to leave the country for inadvertently supporting the enemy.) Percy's troops arrived in Lexington at about 2:00 p.m. They could hear gunfire in the distance as they set up their cannon and deployed lines of regulars on high ground with commanding views of the town. Colonel Smith's men approached like a fleeing mob with the full complement of colonial militia in close formation pursuing them. Percy ordered his artillery to open fire at extreme range, dispersing the colonial militiamen. Smith's men collapsed with exhaustion once they reached the safety of Percy's lines.

Against the advice of his Master of Ordnance, Percy had left Boston without spare ammunition for his men or for the two artillery pieces they brought with them, thinking the extra wagons would slow him down. Each man in Percy's brigade had only 36 rounds, and each artillery piece was supplied with only a few rounds carried in side-boxes. After Percy had left the city, Gage directed two ammunition wagons guarded by one officer and thirteen men to follow. This convoy was intercepted by a small party of older, veteran militiamen still on the "alarm list", who could not join their militia companies because they were well over 60 years of age. These men rose up in ambush and demanded the surrender of the wagons, but the regulars ignored them and drove their horses on. The old men opened fire, shot the lead horses, killed two sergeants, and wounded the officer. The British survivors ran, and six of them threw their weapons into a pond before they surrendered.

Lexington to Menotomy 

Percy assumed control of the combined forces of about 1,700 men and let them rest, eat, drink, and have their wounds tended at field headquarters (Munroe Tavern) before resuming the march. They set out from Lexington at about 3:30 p.m., in a formation that emphasized defense along the sides and rear of the column. Wounded regulars rode on the cannon and were forced to hop off when they were fired at by gatherings of militia. Percy's men were often surrounded, but they had the tactical advantage of interior lines. Percy could shift his units more easily to where they were needed, while the colonial militia was required to move around the outside of his formation. Percy placed Smith's men in the middle of the column, while the 23rd Regiment's line companies made up the column's rearguard. Because of information provided by Smith and Pitcairn about how the Americans were attacking, Percy ordered the rear guard to be rotated every mile or so, to allow some of his troops to rest briefly. Flanking companies were sent to both sides of the road, and a powerful force of Marines acted as the vanguard to clear the road ahead.

During the respite at Lexington, Brigadier General William Heath arrived and took command of the militia. Earlier in the day, he had traveled first to Watertown to discuss tactics with Joseph Warren, who had left Boston that morning, and other members of the Massachusetts Committee of Safety. Heath and Warren reacted to Percy's artillery and flankers by ordering the militiamen to avoid close formations that would attract cannon fire. Instead, they surrounded Percy's marching square with a moving ring of skirmishers at a distance to inflict maximum casualties at minimum risk.

A few mounted militiamen on the road would dismount, fire muskets at the approaching regulars, then remount and gallop ahead to repeat the tactic. Infantry units would apply pressure to the sides of the British column. When it moved out of range, those units would move around and forward to re-engage the column further down the road. Heath sent messengers out to intercept arriving militia units, directing them to appropriate places along the road to engage the regulars. Some towns sent supply wagons to assist in feeding and rearming the militia. Heath and Warren did lead skirmishers in small actions into battle themselves, but it was the presence of effective leadership that probably had the greatest impact on the success of these tactics.

The fighting grew more intense as Percy's forces crossed from Lexington into Menotomy. Fresh militia poured gunfire into the British ranks from a distance, and individual homeowners began to fight from their own property.  Marksmen were also concealed in some homes, forcing the British to clear their path of retreat house by house, a soldier's nightmare. Jason Russell pleaded for his friends to fight alongside him to defend his house by saying, "An Englishman's home is his castle." He stayed and was killed in his doorway. His friends, depending on which account is to be believed, either hid in the cellar or died in the house from bullets and bayonets after shooting at the soldiers who followed them in. The Jason Russell House still stands and contains bullet holes from this fight. A militia unit that attempted an ambush from Russell's orchard was caught by flankers, and eleven men were killed, some allegedly after they had surrendered.

Percy lost control of his men, and many regulars began to commit atrocities to repay for the supposed scalping at the North Bridge and for their own casualties at the hands of a distant, often unseen enemy. Based on the word of Pitcairn and other wounded officers from Smith's command, Percy had learned that the Minutemen were using stone walls, trees and buildings in these more thickly settled towns closer to Boston to hide behind and shoot at the column. He ordered the flank companies to clear the colonial militiamen out of such places.

Many of the junior officers in the flank parties had difficulty stopping their exhausted, enraged men from killing everyone they found inside these buildings. For example, two innocent drunks who refused to hide in the basement of a tavern in Menotomy were killed only because they were suspected of being involved with the day's events. Although many of the accounts of ransacking and burnings were exaggerated later by the colonists for propaganda value (and to get financial compensation from the colonial government), it is certainly true that taverns along the road were ransacked and the liquor stolen by the troops, who in some cases became drunk themselves. One church's communion silver was stolen but was later recovered after it was sold in Boston. Aged Menotomy resident Samuel Whittemore killed three regulars before he was attacked by a British contingent and left for dead. (He recovered from his wounds and later died in 1793 at age 98.) All told, far more blood was shed in Menotomy and Cambridge than elsewhere that day. The colonists lost 25 men killed and nine wounded there, and the British lost 40 killed and 80 wounded, with the 47th Foot and the Marines suffering the highest casualties. Each was about half the day's fatalities.

Menotomy to Charlestown 
The British troops crossed the Menotomy River (today known as Alewife Brook) into Cambridge, and the fight grew more intense. Fresh militia arrived in close array instead of in a scattered formation, and Percy used his two artillery pieces and flankers at a crossroads called Watson's Corner to inflict heavy damage on them.

Earlier in the day, Heath had ordered the Great Bridge to be dismantled. Percy's brigade was about to approach the broken-down bridge and a riverbank filled with militia when Percy directed his troops down a narrow track (now Beech Street, near present-day Porter Square) and onto the road to Charlestown. The militia (now numbering about 4,000) were unprepared for this movement, and the circle of fire was broken. An American force moved to occupy Prospect Hill (in modern-day Somerville), which dominated the road, but Percy moved his cannon to the front and dispersed them with his last rounds of ammunition.

A large militia force arrived from Salem and Marblehead. They might have cut off Percy's route to Charlestown, but these men halted on nearby Winter Hill and allowed the British to escape. Some accused the commander of this force, Colonel Timothy Pickering, of permitting the troops to pass because he still hoped to avoid war by preventing a total defeat of the regulars. Pickering later claimed that he had stopped on Heath's orders, but Heath denied this. It was nearly dark when Pitcairn's Marines defended a final attack on Percy's rear as they entered Charlestown. The regulars took up strong positions on the hills of Charlestown. Some of them had been without sleep for two days and had marched  in 21 hours, eight hours of which had been spent under fire. But now they held high ground protected by heavy guns from HMS Somerset. Gage quickly sent over line companies of two fresh regiments—the 10th and 64th—to occupy the high ground in Charlestown and build fortifications. Although they were begun, the fortifications were never completed and would later be a starting point for the militia works built two months later in June before the Battle of Bunker Hill. General Heath studied the position of the British Army and decided to withdraw the militia to Cambridge.

Aftermath 

In the morning, Boston was surrounded by a huge militia army, numbering over 15,000, which had marched from throughout New England. Unlike the Powder Alarm, the rumors of spilled blood were true, and the Revolutionary War had begun. Now under the leadership of General Artemas Ward, who arrived on the 20th and replaced Brigadier General William Heath, they formed a siege line extending from Chelsea, around the peninsulas of Boston and Charlestown, to Roxbury, effectively surrounding Boston on three sides. In the days immediately following, the size of the colonial forces grew, as militias from New Hampshire, Rhode Island, and Connecticut arrived on the scene. The Second Continental Congress adopted these men into the beginnings of the Continental Army. Even now, after open warfare had started, Gage still refused to impose martial law in Boston. He persuaded the town's selectmen to surrender all private weapons in return for promising that any inhabitant could leave town.

The battle was not a major one in terms of tactics or casualties. However, in terms of supporting the British political strategy behind the Intolerable Acts and the military strategy behind the Powder Alarms, the battle was a significant failure because the expedition contributed to the fighting it was intended to prevent, and because few weapons were actually seized.

The battle was followed by a war for British political opinion. Within four days of the battle, the Massachusetts Provincial Congress had collected scores of sworn testimonies from militiamen and from British prisoners. When word leaked out a week after the battle that Gage was sending his official description of events to London, the Provincial Congress sent a packet of these detailed depositions, signed by over 100 participants in the events, on a faster ship. The documents were presented to a sympathetic official and printed by the London newspapers two weeks before Gage's report arrived. Gage's official report was too vague on particulars to influence anyone's opinion. George Germain, no friend of the colonists, wrote, "the Bostonians are in the right to make the King's troops the aggressors and claim a victory". Politicians in London tended to blame Gage for the conflict instead of their own policies and instructions. The British troops in Boston variously blamed General Gage and Colonel Smith for the failures at Lexington and Concord.

The day after the battle, John Adams left his home in Braintree to ride along the battlefields. He became convinced that "the Die was cast, the Rubicon crossed". Thomas Paine in Philadelphia had previously thought of the argument between the colonies and the Home Country as "a kind of law-suit", but after news of the battle reached him, he "rejected the hardened, sullen-tempered Pharaoh of England forever". George Washington received the news at Mount Vernon and wrote to a friend, "the once-happy and peaceful plains of America are either to be drenched in blood or inhabited by slaves. Sad alternative! But can a virtuous man hesitate in his choice?" A group of hunters on the frontier named their campsite Lexington when they heard news of the battle in June. It eventually became the city of Lexington, Kentucky.

Legacy 

It was important to the early American government that an image of British fault and American innocence be maintained for this first battle of the war. The history of Patriot preparations, intelligence, warning signals, and uncertainty about the first shot was rarely discussed in the public sphere for decades. The story of the wounded British soldier at the North Bridge, hors de combat, struck down on the head by a Minuteman using a hatchet, the purported "scalping", was strongly suppressed. Depositions mentioning some of these activities were not published and were returned to the participants (this notably happened to Paul Revere). Paintings portrayed the Lexington fight as an unjustified slaughter.

The issue of which side was to blame grew during the early nineteenth century. For example, older participants' testimony in later life about Lexington and Concord differed greatly from their depositions taken under oath in 1775. All now said the British fired first at Lexington, whereas fifty or so years before, they weren't sure. All now said they fired back, but in 1775, they said few were able to. The "Battle" took on an almost mythical quality in the American consciousness. Legend became more important than truth. A complete shift occurred, and the Patriots were portrayed as actively fighting for their cause, rather than as suffering innocents. Paintings of the Lexington skirmish began to portray the militia standing and fighting back in defiance.

Ralph Waldo Emerson immortalized the events at the North Bridge in his 1837 "Concord Hymn". The "Concord Hymn" became important because it commemorated the beginning of the American Revolution, and that for much of the 19th century it was a means by which Americans learned about the Revolution, helping to forge the identity of the nation.

After 1860, several generations of schoolchildren memorized Henry Wadsworth Longfellow's poem "Paul Revere's Ride". Historically it is inaccurate (for example, Paul Revere never made it to Concord), but it captures the idea that an individual can change the course of history.

In the 20th century, popular and historical opinion varied about the events of the historic day, often reflecting the political mood of the time. Isolationist anti-war sentiments before the World Wars bred skepticism about the nature of Paul Revere's contribution (if any) to the efforts to rouse the militia. Anglophilia in the United States after the turn of the twentieth century led to more balanced approaches to the history of the battle. During World War I, a film about Paul Revere's ride was seized under the Espionage Act of 1917 for promoting discord between the United States and Britain.

During the Cold War, Revere was used not only as a patriotic symbol, but also as a capitalist one. In 1961, novelist Howard Fast published April Morning, an account of the battle from a fictional 15-year-old's perspective, and reading of the book has been frequently assigned in American secondary schools. A film version was produced for television in 1987, starring Chad Lowe and Tommy Lee Jones. In the 1990s, parallels were drawn between American tactics in the Vietnam War and those of the British Army at Lexington and Concord.

The site of the battle in Lexington is now known as the Lexington Battle Green. It has been listed on the National Register of Historic Places and is a National Historic Landmark. Several memorials commemorating the battle have been established there.

There are walking trails with interpretive displays along routes that the colonists might have used that skirted the road, and the Park Service often has personnel (usually dressed in period dress) offering descriptions of the area and explanations of the events of the day. A bronze bas relief of Major Buttrick, designed by Daniel Chester French and executed by Edmond Thomas Quinn in 1915, is in the park, along with French's Minute Man statue. The American Battlefield Trust and its partners have saved one acre of the battlefield at the site of Parker's Revenge.

Four current units of the Massachusetts National Guard units (181st Infantry, 182nd Infantry, 101st Engineer Battalion, and 125th Quartermaster Company) are derived from American units that participated in the Battles of Lexington and Concord. There are only thirty current units of the U.S. Army with colonial roots.

Several ships of the United States Navy, including two World War II aircraft carriers, were named in honor of the Battle of Lexington.

Commemorations 

Patriots' Day, an observed legal holiday is celebrated annually in honor of the battle in Massachusetts. It is recognized by that state, as well as by Connecticut, Maine, and by the Wisconsin public schools, on the third Monday in April. Re-enactments of Paul Revere's ride are staged, as are the battle on the Lexington Green, and ceremonies and firings are held at the North Bridge.

Centennial commemoration 
On April 19, 1875, President Ulysses S. Grant and members of his cabinet joined 50,000 people to mark the 100th anniversary of the battles. The sculpture by Daniel Chester French, The Minute Man, located at the North Bridge, was unveiled on that day. A formal ball took place in the evening at the Agricultural Hall in Concord.

Sesquicentennial commemoration 
In April 1925, the United States Post Office issued three stamps commemorating the 150th anniversary of the Battles at Lexington and Concord. The Lexington—Concord commemorative stamps were the first of many commemoratives issued to honor the 150th anniversaries of events that surrounded America's War of Independence. The three stamps were first placed on sale in Washington, D.C. and in five Massachusetts cities and towns that played major roles in the Lexington and Concord story: Lexington, Concord, Boston, Cambridge, and Concord Junction (as West Concord was then known). This is not to say that other locations were not involved in the battles.

The events were also commemorated on the 1925 Lexington-Concord Sesquicentennial half dollar.

Bicentennial commemoration 

The Town of Concord invited 700 prominent U.S. citizens and leaders from the worlds of government, the military, the diplomatic corps, the arts, sciences, and humanities to commemorate the 200th anniversary of the battles. On April 19, 1975, as a crowd estimated at 110,000 gathered to view a parade and celebrate the Bicentennial in Concord, President Gerald Ford delivered a major speech near the North Bridge, which was televised to the nation.

President Ford laid a wreath at the base of The Minute Man statue and then respectfully observed as Sir Peter Ramsbotham, the British Ambassador to the United States, laid a wreath at the grave of British soldiers killed in the battle.

See also 

 List of American Revolutionary War battles
 American Revolutionary War#Early engagements
 Westminster Massacre

Notes

References 

 
 
 
 
 
 
 
 
 
 
 
  This book is extensively footnoted, and contains a voluminous list of primary resources concerning all aspects of these events.
 
 
 
 
 
 Galvin, Gen. John R. The Minute Men: The First Fight: Myths & Realities of the American Revolution, Pergamon-Brassey's, Washington, D.C., 1989. . This book provides a military perspective on the battle and its leaders.
 
 
 
 
 
 
 
 
 
 
 
 
 
 Raphael, Ray and Marie Raphael (2015). The Spirit of '74: How the American Revolution Began. New York: New Press.

Further reading 
 Greenwalt, Phillip S., and Robert Orrison. A Single Blow: The Battles of Lexington and Concord and the Beginning of the American Revolution, April 19, 1775. Emerging Revolutionary War Series. El Dorado Hills, CA: Savas Beatie, 2018. .

Newspaper articles published near the time of the battles 
  — Massachusetts Provincial Congress resolution to put the colony into "a complete state of defense"
  — John Hancock calling Massachusetts Provincial Congress to assemble, in view of "intelligence received from the last vessels from Great Britain", and related occurrences.
  — An early description of the battles and recited troop strengths and initial casualty reports.

External links 

 National Park Service site for Minute Man National Historical Park
 Buckman Tavern – Lexington Historical Society
 Why We Remember Lexington and Concord and the 19th of April
 Rescued cannon returns to Concord
 Battles of Lexington and Concord
 Articles about the Concord Fight in Concord Magazine
 Animated History of the Battles of Lexington and Concord 
 Concord Massachusetts
 Merriam's Corner
 Lexington Alarm Letter at Van Gorden-Williams Library & Archives
  Facts and figures on Acton, Bedford, Concord and Lexington of the period, including the rosters of the towns' Minute Men and Militia
 Statements of American combatants at Lexington and Concord contained in supplement "Official Papers Concerning the Skirmishes at Lexington and Concord" to The Military Journals of Private Soldiers, 1758–1775, by Abraham Tomlinson for the Poughkeepsie, NY, museum, 1855.

1775 in the Thirteen Colonies
Conflicts in 1775
Lexington and Concord
Lexington and Concord
Lexington
Concord, Massachusetts
Lexington, Massachusetts
Arlington, Massachusetts
Lincoln, Massachusetts
History of Cambridge, Massachusetts
History of Middlesex County, Massachusetts
1775 in Massachusetts
Military history of New England
Lexington